Malcolm Scott Ciencin (September 1, 1962 – August 5, 2014) was an American author of adult and children's fiction.  He co-authored several books with his wife Denise Ciencin.

Biography
Malcolm Scott Ciencin was born in 1962. He was a New York Times bestselling author who wrote adult and children's fiction and works in a variety of mediums including comic books. Among his works are novels written for the Dungeons & Dragons role playing game campaign settings. He also wrote books for the Dinotopia series. was a New York Times best-selling novelist of 90+ books from Simon & Schuster, Random House, Scholastic, Harper and many more. He had also written comic books, screenplays, and worked on video games. He created programs for Scholastic Books, designed trading cards, consulted on video games, directed and produced audio programs & TV commercials, and wrote in the medical field about neurosurgery and neurology. He first worked in TV production as a writer, producer and director.

Personal life
Ciencin lived in Sarasota, Florida with his wife (and sometimes co-author) Denise. He died in August 2014 of a blood clot to the brain.

Bibliography

Forgotten Realms

The Avatar Series
Originally published under the pseudonym Richard Awlinson. Ciencin shared the pseudonym with Troy Denning, who wrote part 3 of the Avatar Series "Waterdeep," and James Lowder who edited the trilogy and wrote parts of "Tantras."
 Shadowdale, (1989) 
 Tantras, (1989)

The Harpers
 The Night Parade, (1992)

Robert Silverberg's Time Tours
Published under the pseudonym Nick Baron.
 Glory's End, (1990) 
 The Pirate Paradox, (1991) , with Greg Cox

The Wolves of Autumn
 The Wolves of Autumn, (1992) 
 The Lotus and the Rose, (1992)

The Vampire Odyssey
 The Vampire Odyssey, (1992) 
 The Wildlings, (1992) 
 Parliament of Blood, (1992)

The Nightmare Club
Published under the pseudonym Nick Baron.
 The Initiation, (1993) 
 The Mask, (1993) 
 Slay Ride, (1993) 
 Spring Break, (1994)

WildC.A.T.S, Covert Action Teams
Dark Blade Falling, (1995) 
Evil Within, (1995)

Dinotopia

 Windchaser, (1995) 
 Lost City, (1996) 
 Sabertooth Mountain, (1996) , with John Vornholt
 Thunderfalls, (1996) 
 Sky Dance, (1999) 
 Return to the Lost City, (2000) 
 The Explorers, (2001)

The Elven Ways
 The Ways of Magic, (1996) 
 Ancient Games, (1997) 
 Night of Glory, (1998)

The Lurker Files
 Faceless, (1996) 
 Know Fear, (1996) 
 Nemesis, (1997) 
 Incarnate, (1997) 
 Apparition, (1997) 
 Triad, (1997)

Godzilla
Godzilla, King of the Monsters, (1996) 
Godzilla Invades America, (1997) 
Godzilla: Journey to Monster Island, (1998) 
Godzilla vs. the Space Monster, (1998)

Dinoverse
 I Was A Teenage T-Rex, (1999) , originally published as Dinoverse
 The Teens Time Forgot, (2000) 
 Raptor Without A Cause, (2000) 
 Please Don't Eat the Teacher, (2000) 
 Beverly Hills Brontosaurus, (2000) 
 Dinosaurs Ate My Homework, (2000)

Gen¹³
Time and Chance, (2001) , with Jeff Marriotte

Jurassic Park Adventures
Ciencin's Jurassic Park stories are original novels based on the Jurassic Park films rather than directly on Michael Crichton's work.

 Jurassic Park Adventures: Survivor, (2001) 
 Jurassic Park Adventures: Prey, (2001) 
 Jurassic Park Adventures: Flyers, (2002)

Buffyverse
Sweet Sixteen (Buffy novel), (2001) 
Vengeance (Angel novel), (2002) , with Dan Jolley
The Longest Night (Angel novel), (2002) , with Denise Ciencin
Nemesis (Angel novel), (2003) , with Denise Ciencin
Mortal Fear (Buffy novel), (2003) , with Denise Ciencin

Starfleet Corps of Engineers

 Some Assembly Required, (2002) , with Greg Brodeur, Dave Galanter, Dan Jolley, Aaron Rosenberg, and Keith R.A. DeCandido
 Age of Unreason, (2003) 
 Breakdowns, (2005) , with Keith R. A. DeCandido, Kevin Dilmore, Heather Jarman, and Dayton Ward

Transformers
 Hardwired, (2003)

Kim Possible

 Tweeb Trouble, (2004)

EverQuest
The Rogue's Hour, (2004)

Charmed
Luck Be a Lady, (2004) 
Light of the World, (2006) 
High Spirits, (2007)

Kim Possible: Pick a Villain

 Game On!, (2005) 
 Masters of Mayhem, (2005)

Standalone novels
Virtual Destruction, (1995) 
Jurassic Park 3, (2001) 
Even Stevens: The Stevens Get Even, (2004) 
The Legend of Zorro, (2005)

Comic books and other works

Scott Ciencin also wrote comic books. His credits include

A Winter's Tale - from Captain America: Red, White & Blue with art by Pasqual Ferry from Marvel
Trial by Fire - mini-series with art by Ron Wagner set in R.A. Salvatore's Demonwars universe - from CrossGen
Eye for an Eye - mini-series with art by Greg Tucchini set in R.A. Salvatore's Demonwars universe - from CrossGen
Metropolis S.C.U. - with artist Roger Robinson from D.C.
New Gods: A Shadow Over Eden - from D.C.
New Gods: Acts of God - from D.C.
Star Trek: The Next Generation: The Killing Shadows - mini-series from Wildstorm with art by Bryan Hitch and Andrew Currie
Star Bus: Attack of the Cling-Ons, (2011) , with art by Jeff Crowther
Silent Hill: Dying Inside - mini-series with art by Ben Templesmith and Aadi Salmon from IDW
Silent Hill: Paint it Black - art by Shaun Thomas from IDW
Silent Hill: Among the Damned - art by Shaun Thomas from IDW
Silent Hill: The Grinning Man - art by Nick Stakal from IDW
Silent Hill: Dead/Alive - mini-series with art by Nick Stakal from IDW
Silent Hill: Three Bloody Tales - art by Nick Stakal, and Shaun Thomas from IDW

Original PSP Creation for Sony and Konami

Silent Hill Experience: The Hunger

References

External links
 Official website of Scott Ciencin 
 Fantasticfiction.co.uk - Bibliography

1962 births
2014 deaths
20th-century American male writers
20th-century American novelists
21st-century American male writers
21st-century American novelists
American children's writers
American comics writers
American male novelists
Deaths from blood clot